Osage City is a city in Osage County, Kansas, United States.  As of the 2020 census, the population of the city was 2,861.

History
Osage City was surveyed and platted in late 1869, after the route of the Atchison, Topeka and Santa Fe Railway had been fixed, but before it had been built to the city.  Osage City was incorporated as a city in April 1872. Like Osage County, the city was named for the Osage Nation.

Osage City was a very busy coal mining town in the 19th century.  In the summer of 1870, the first coal mines were opened by the Osage Carbon, Coal & Mining Company.  At one time, there were twenty-eight mine shafts and 1,200 men employed.

Geography
Osage City is located at  (38.634069, -95.826759).

Climate
The climate in this area is characterized by hot, humid summers and generally mild to cool winters.  According to the Köppen Climate Classification system, Osage City has a humid subtropical climate, abbreviated "Cfa" on climate maps.

Demographics

Osage City is part of the Topeka, Kansas Metropolitan Statistical Area.

2010 census
As of the 2010 United States census, there were 2,943 people in 1,213 households, including 757 families, in the city. The racial makeup of the city was 97% White, 0.2% African American, 0.3% Native American, 0.3% Asian, 0.2% from other races, and 2.0% from two or more races. Hispanic or Latino of any race were 3.9% of the population.

Of the 1,213 households 30.2% had children under the age of 18 living with them, 44.8% were married couples living together, 12.8% had a female householder with no husband present, 4.8% had a male householder with no wife present, and 37.6% were non-families. 33.2% of households were one person and 17.4% were one person aged 65 or older. The average household size was 2.34 and the average family size was 2.95.

The median age was 40.8 years. 25.5% of residents were under the age of 18; 6.9% were between the ages of 18 and 24; 21.9% were from 25 to 44; 25.6% were from 45 to 64; and 20.1% were 65 or older. The gender makeup of the city was 47.8% male and 52.2% female.

2000 census
At the 2000 census there were 3,034 people in 1,232 households, including 815 families, in the city. The racial makeup of the city was 96.31% White, 0.36% African American, 1.05% Native American, 0.07% Asian, 0.40% Pacific Islander, 0.53% from other races, and 1.29% from two or more races. Hispanic or Latino of any race were 2.34%.

Of the 1,232 households 33.5% had children under the age of 18 living with them, 52.6% were married couples living together, 9.5% had a female householder with no husband present, and 33.8% were non-families. 30.8% of households were one person and 16.2% were one person aged 65 or older. The average household size was 2.38 and the average family size was 2.95.

The age distribution was 27.1% under the age of 18, 6.4% from 18 to 24, 26.0% from 25 to 44, 19.6% from 45 to 64, and 20.9% 65 or older. The median age was 39 years. For every 100 females, there were 91.5 males. For every 100 females age 18 and over, there were 87.2 males.

The median household income was $31,979, and the median family income  was $39,362. Males had a median income of $27,353 versus $21,514 for females. The per capita income for the city was $17,227. About 6.8% of families and 8.8% of the population were below the poverty line, including 5.5% of those under age 18 and 12.9% of those age 65 or over.

Economy
Norseman Plastics is located in Osage City.  In 2008, Orbis acquired the company, and changed its name.

Government
The Osage City government consists of a city manager, mayor and eight council members.  The council meets the 2nd and 4th Tuesday of each month at 7 pm.  The Mayor is elected on two year terms and council members on four year terms.

Education
The community is served by Osage City USD 420 public school district.

Transportation

Osage City was located on the National Old Trails Road, also known as the Ocean-to-Ocean Highway, that was established in 1912.

Notable people
 C. D. Batchelor, political editorial cartoonist
 Michael P. Ryan, Marine Major general
 Blake Treinen, baseball player

See also
 National Register of Historic Places listings in Osage County, Kansas
 National Old Trails Road

References

Further reading

External links

 City of Osage City
 Osage City - Directory of Public Officials
 Osage City Herald-Chronicle, local newspaper
 Historic Images of Osage City, Special Photo Collections at Wichita State University Library
 Osage City map, KDOT

Cities in Osage County, Kansas
Cities in Kansas
Topeka metropolitan area, Kansas